Balarampuram is a village in Rowthulapudi Mandal, Kakinada district in the state of Andhra Pradesh in India.

Geography 

Demographics 
 India census, Balarampuram had a population of 2,050, out of which 1065 were male and 985 were female. Population of children below 6 years of age were 204. The literacy rate of the village is 54.77%.

References 

Villages in Rowthulapudi mandal